Stelis velaticaulis is a species of orchid plant native to Colombia, Costa Rica, Ecuador, Peru, Trinidad-Tobago, and Venezuela.

References 

velaticaulis
Flora of Ecuador
Flora of Costa Rica
Flora of Peru
Flora of Trinidad and Tobago
Flora of Venezuela
Flora without expected TNC conservation status